The Bengal spaghetti-eel (Moringua arundinacea) is an eel in the family Moringuidae (spaghetti eels). It was described by John McClelland in 1844, originally under the genus Ptyobranchus. It is a tropical eel known from estuaries in the Ganges River, between India and Bangladesh. Males can reach a maximum total length of 65 cm.

References

Moringuidae
Fish described in 1844